Ruyter, DeRuyter and De Ruyter may refer to:

Places
 DeRuyter (village), New York
 DeRuyter (town), New York
DeRuyter Central School in DeRuyter town
 DeRuyter Reservoir

Given name
Ruyter Suys (born 1968), lead guitar player of the band Nashville Pussy

Surname
 Engel de Ruyter (1649–1683), Dutch vice admiral
 Maika Ruyter-Hooley (born 1987), Australian football player
 Michiel de Ruyter (1607–1676), Dutch Admiral
 HNLMS De Ruyter, several ships named after the Dutch Admiral
 De Ruyter Medal, awarded to members of the Dutch Merchant fleet
 Michiel de Ruyter, a 2015 Dutch film
 Stephnie de Ruyter, leader of the New Zealand Democratic Party
 Tim DeRuyter (born 1963), American football coach
 Yves Deruyter, Belgian DJ and artist

See also